TUGZip is a freeware file archiver for Microsoft Windows. It handles a great variety of archive formats, including some of the commonly used ones like zip, rar, gzip, bzip2, sqx and 7z. It can also view disk image files like BIN, C2D, IMG, ISO and NRG. TugZip repairs corrupted ZIP archives and can encrypt files with 6 different algorithms.

Since the release of TUGZip 3.5.0.0, development has been suspended due to lack of time from Kindahl's side.

Supported formats 

TUGZip supports the following file formats:

 Disc images BIN, C2D, IMG, ISO, NRG
 File archives 7z (7-zip), A, ACE (Extraction only; compression and other features can be added via Ace32.exe), ARC, ARJ, BH, BZ2, CAB, CPIO, DEB, GCA, GZ, IMP, JAR, LHA (LZH), LIB, RAR (Extraction only; compression can be added via rar.exe), RPM, SQX, TAR, TAZ, TBZ, TGZ, YZ1, ZIP, ZOO

See also
 List of file archivers
 Comparison of file archivers
 InfraRecorder - An open source software from the same author

References

External links

Windows compression software
Windows-only freeware
File archivers